The Dog or The Dogs may refer to:

Film and television
 The Dogs (film), a 1979 French film
 The Dog (1992 film), a short experimental film
 The Dog (2013 film), a documentary about Dog Day Afternoon
 "The Dog" (Seinfeld), an episode of Seinfeld
 The Dog in the Pond, a fictional public house in Hollyoaks
 The Dog, a character in Death Toll
 The Dog, a minor character in Red Dwarf
 The Dog (Fear the Walking Dead), an episode of the television series Fear the Walking Dead

Music
Dogs (French band), a 1970s French punk band
Dogs (British band), an indie rock group
The Dogs (US punk band), a Michigan proto-punk group
The Dogs (American hip hop group), an American hip-hop band
The Dogs, a Finnish band featuring Ile Kallio
"The Dog", a song by The Damned on their 1982 album Strawberries
"The Dog", a song by Rufus Thomas

Other uses
 The Dog (Goya), a painting by Francisco Goya
The Dogs, Wincanton, a house in Wincanton, Somerset, England
Dog Islands, an island group in the British Virgin Islands
 The Dog (franchise), a Japanese franchise created in 2000
 The Dog: Happy Life, a 2006 pet simulator video game
 The Dog Island, a 2007 adventure video game
 Bulldogs Rugby League Football Club or The Dogs, an Australian football club
 The Dog, a character in Footrot Flats

See also 
 Dog (disambiguation)